The Eurovision Debate is a live televised debate between the lead political candidates (“Spitzenkandidaten”) running to be the next President of the European Commission. Produced by the European Broadcasting Union (EBU) and broadcast across Europe via the Eurovision network, it is hosted by the European Parliament in Brussels, Belgium. The aim of the debate is to help public service media play their role in the democratic process by helping to better inform citizens and encouraging participation in the elections.

History
The first Eurovision Debate took place on 15 May 2014 and was the first-ever live televised format to bring democratic political debate to a pan-European level. Italian journalist and Director of the Rai News24  moderated the debate with RTÉ's Conor McNally as its social media co-presenter. The Eurovision Debate is produced by the EBU under the guidance and the supervision of senior editors from European Public Service Media (the “Editorial Board”) and was directed by Rob Hopkin.

During the 90-minute debate, the following issues were to be addressed: migration, unemployment, security and climate change, and the role of Europe in the world. In fact, the debate was more about the common minimum wage, the European business tax, the reduction of greenhouse gas emissions, the border control associated with solidarity, and the use of trade to improve working conditions in Europe.

Format
The debate is presented by 2 television anchor personalities who ask the candidates on stage a series of questions on pre-determined themes, although the questions themselves are not known in advance. The debate obeys the strictest rules of transparency and neutrality, all candidates are allocated exactly the same speaking time. Interpretation is provided in almost all EU official languages.

The order in which the candidates take the floor is decided by a draw which happens 5 weeks before the debate itself. The Eurovision Debate also uses social media to spark debate among citizens throughout Europe around issues that are topical for the European Parliament elections. A third anchor person is monitoring the exchanges online and reports to the journalists on stage so that the social media dimension is taken into account during the discussions.

Candidates

2014
Alexis Tsipras (Greece, European Left)
Ska Keller (Germany, European Green Party)
Martin Schulz (Germany, Party of European Socialists)
Jean-Claude Juncker (Luxembourg, European People’s Party)
Guy Verhofstadt (Belgium, Alliance of Liberals and Democrats for Europe)

2019
The speaking order and the placing of the lead candidates were decided at the allocation draw held on 4 April.
Nico Cué (Spain, European Left)
Ska Keller (Germany, European Green Party)
Jan Zahradil (Czech Republic, Alliance of Conservatives and Reformists in Europe)
Margrethe Vestager (Denmark, Alliance of Liberals and Democrats for Europe)
Manfred Weber (Germany, European People’s Party)
Frans Timmermans (Netherlands, Party of European Socialists)

Broadcast
The debate is broadcast in more than 25 countries on TV, radio and online. For the 2019 edition, the following channels and broadcasters aired the debate:

 : İctimai Television
 : VRT and RTBF
 : BNT
 : HRT
 : CyBC
 : ČT
 : DR TV
 : ERR
 : France Info, Arte, Public Sénat and TV5Monde
 : Yle
 : GPB
 : Phoenix
 : ERT
 : RTÉ News Now
 : Rai News24
 : NPO
 : TVP and PR
 : TVR
 : RTVE Canal 24h, TvG2 and Canal Sur 2
 : SVT
 : BBC Parliament
 : Kingston TV

See also
2014 European Parliament election
2019 European Parliament election

References

External links

 

English-language television shows
Simulcasts
Leaders' debates
European Parliament
2019 European Parliament election
2014 establishments in Europe
May 2014 events in Europe
Events in Brussels
2014 in Belgium
Political debates
Debate
2014 European Parliament election
Recurring events established in 2014
May 2019 events in Europe
2019 in Belgium